The Nadistuti sukta (Sanskrit: नदिस्तुति सूक्त), or  "the hymn in praise of rivers", is 75th hymn (sukta) of 10th Mandala of the Rigveda.
Nadistuti sukta is important for the reconstruction of the geography of the Vedic civilization. Sindhu (the Indus) is addressed as the mightiest of rivers and addressed specifically in verses 1, 2, 7, 8 and 9.

The rivers
In verse 5, the rishi enumerates ten rivers, beginning with the Ganga and moving westwards:

Ganga
Yamuna
Sarasvati
Sutudri
Parusni
Asikni
Marudvrdha
Vitasta
Arjikiya
Susoma

Verse 6 adds northwestern rivers (tributaries of the Indus flowing through Afghanistan and north-western Pakistan),

Griffith translates:
"First united with the Trishtama in order to flow, with the Susartu and
Rasa, and with this Svetya (you flow), O Sindhu (Indus) with the Kubha
(Kabul R.) to the Gomati (Gomal), with the Mehatnu to the
Krumu (Kurram), with whom you rush together on the same chariot."

Trstama
Susartu
Rasā
Shvetya
Sindhu
Kubha
Gomati
Krumu
Mehatnu

According to Max Mueller on 10.75.5 in the book India: What Can It Teach Us? : 
"Satadru (Sutlej)". "Parushni (Iravati, Ravi)". "Asikni, which means black". "It is the modern Chinab". " Marudvridha, a general name for river. According to Roth the combined course of the Akesines and Hydaspes". Vitasta, the last of the rivers of the Punjab, changed in Greek into Hydaspes"."It is the modern Behat or Jilam". "According to Yaska the Arjikiya is the Vipas". "Its modern name is Bias or Bejah". "According to Yaska the Sushoma is the Indus".

References

External links
The Geography of the Rigveda

Rigveda
 
Vedic hymns